The Libertine may refer to:

 The Libertine (1969 film), directed by Pasquale Festa Campanile
 The Libertine (2000 film), a French film starring Vincent Pérez and Fanny Ardant
 The Libertine (2004 film), starring Johnny Depp, John Malkovich, Samantha Morton, and Rosamund Pike
 "The Libertine" (song), a song by Patrick Wolf
 The Libertines, a British rock band
 The Libertines (album), a 2004 album by The Libertines
 The Libertine (album), by Michael Nyman for the 2004 film
 The Libertine (book), an 1807 English novel by Charlotte Dacre
 The Libertine (play), a 1676 play by Thomas Shadwell
 The Libertine, a 1994 play by Stephen Jeffreys

See also 
 Libertine (disambiguation)